The Ministry of Defence of the Republic of Slovenia (Slovene abbreviation MORS) is a ministry of the Republic of Slovenia, in charge of Slovenia's defence against external enemies and natural disasters.

The Ministry is led by the Minister of Defence of the Republic of Slovenia, who is appointed by the Slovenian Prime Minister and approved by the National Assembly of the Republic of Slovenia. The Minister is also part of the government.

The Ministry is located on Vojkova 55 in Ljubljana (Kardeljeva platform).

Organization 
Cabinet Minister
Secretariat Chief Secretary
DG i: 
Defence Policy Directorate of the Ministry of Defence of the Republic of Slovenia 
Strategic and Business Planning Division 
International Operations and Missions Division 
Nato Division
European Division
Multilateral Relations and Defence Diplomacy Division
Nato Central Registry/EU sub-registry
Directorate of Defence Affairs, Ministry of Defence of the Republic of Slovenia 
Department of Civil Defence 
Department of Military Affairs 
Office of the Information and Communications 
The National Center for Crisis Management 
Logistics Directorate of the Ministry of Defence of the Republic of Slovenia 
Department for management of real estate 
Department of standardization and codification 
Section for fitting 
Sector Procurement 
Self-service: 
Intelligence and Security Service of the Ministry of Defence of the Republic of Slovenia 
Office of Public Relations 
Service Protocol 
Internal Audit Service 
Bodies composed of: 
General Staff of Slovenian Armed Forces 
Administration of the Republic of Slovenia for Protection and Rescue 
Inspectorate of the Republic of Slovenia for the defence 
Inspectorate of the Republic of Slovenia for Protection against Natural and Other Disasters

Ministers of Defence of Slovenia 

Janez Janša, Slovenian Democratic Union / Slovenian Democratic Party (16 May 1990 – 29 March 1994)
Jelko Kacin, Liberal Democracy of Slovenia (29 March 1994 – 27 February 1997)
Tit Turnšek, Slovenian People's Party (27 February 1997 – 13 March 1998)
Alojz Krapež, Slovenian People's Party (13 March 1998 – 24 November 1998)
Franci Demšar, Slovenian People's Party (4 February 1999 – 7 June 2000)
Janez Janša, Slovenian Democratic Party (7 June 2000 – 30 November 2000)
Anton Grizold, Liberal Democracy of Slovenia (30 November 2000 – 3 December 2004)
Karl Erjavec, Democratic Party of Pensioners of Slovenia (3 December 2004 – 21 November 2008)
Ljubica Jelušič, Social Democrats (21 November 2008 – 10 February 2012)
Aleš Hojs, New Slovenia (10 February 2012 – 20 March 2013)
Roman Jakič, Positive Slovenia (20 March 2013 – July 2014)
Janko Veber, Social Democrats (19 September 2014 – May 2015)
Andreja Katič, Social Democrats  (13 May 2015 – 13 September 2018)
 Karl Erjavec, Democratic Party of Pensioners of Slovenia (13 September 2018 – 13 March 2020)
 Matej Tonin, New Slovenia (13 March 2020 — 1 June 2022)
 Marjan Šarec, List of Marjan Šarec (since 1 June 2022)

References

External links
  
  

Government of Slovenia
Defence
Organizations based in Ljubljana
Slovenia
Slovenia
Slovenia